The Madagascar national rugby union team represents Madagascar in the sport of rugby union. Although rugby is popular in Madagascar, the country has not yet qualified for a Rugby World Cup. It does compete annually in the Africa Cup, and was runner-up to Uganda in 2007. The national team's nickname is the Malagasy name for the ring-tailed lemur.

Madagascar defeated  57 - 54 in extra-time to win Group 1B final match at the 2012 Africa Cup; they have now jumped up 14 places to their current 42nd rank.

History
Madagascar played their first ever international rugby match in 1970, where they met Italy, losing 9 points to 17. The second of the series of two games was also won by Italy, 6 points to 9. The team got their first international win during 1987 when they defeated Kenya 22 to 16.

During 2001 Madagascar competed for the first time in the Africa qualification tournaments for the 2003 Rugby World Cup to be held in Australia. They started off in Pool B of Round 1, where they contested matches against Botswana and Swaziland. They won both their games and finished at the top of the pool to advance to the next round. In Round 2 they defeated Kenya and Cameroon to secure the top finish and advance to Round 3, which took place in 2002. Madagascar made their exit in Round 3, losing to Namibia and Zimbabwe.

Madagascar attempted to qualify for the 2007 Rugby World Cup in France. They started off in Pool 2 of Round 1b of the qualifying tournament, where they were grouped with Kenya and Uganda. After drawing with Kenya, they lost to Uganda and finished third in the standings. They were semi-finalists at the 2006 Africa Cup, and losing finalists in 2005 and 2007.

Madagascar also failed to qualify for the 2011 Rugby World Cup. It is currently involved in the 2015 Rugby World Cup qualifyings. Madagascar was the surprise winner of the 2012 Africa Cup, defeating Namibia 57–54 in an historical final. In 2013 the Makis avoided relegation from the top flight of African rugby and remain in Division 1A of the Africa Cup for 2014, which will serve as the African qualification for the 2015 Rugby World Cup.

Madagascar wins serendib cup 2013 in Sri Lanka, beating Sri Lanka on a score of 17-12 and dominating Poland on 25–21 score, José Rakoto won the player of the tournament.

Squad
Madagascar squad for the 2014 Africa Cup.

Overall Record
Below is table of the representative rugby matches played by a Madagascar national XV at test level up until 12 July 2021

World Cup Record

See also
Rugby union in Madagascar
 Madagascar national rugby sevens team

References

External links
Madagascar on IRB.com
Madagascar International Statistics, Rugbydata

 
African national rugby union teams
Rugby union in Madagascar